This is an incomplete list of species in the agaric genus Pluteus. Species of Pluteus are commonly found growing on woody substrates including stumps, logs, fallen branches, woody debris such as sawdust, and buried wood.

Three sections are widely accepted in Pluteus, including Pluteus, Hispidoderma Fayod, and Celluloderma Fayod. Section Pluteus is characterized by fruit bodies with a filamentous cap cuticle (pileipellis) and thick-walled pleurocystidia. Section Hispidoderma consists of species with a filamentous pileipellis and thin-walled pleurocystidia. Section Celluloderma is defined by a cystoderm pileipellis composed of ellipsoid to saccate-pyriform to vesiculose cells with or without cystidioid elements. The widespread genus contains over 300 species.

Key

Species

References
Footnotes

Citations

Cited literature

Pluteus species, List of